Barishah or Bari Shah may refer to:
Barishah-e Beyg Morad
Barishah-e Khuybar